The 2001 Auckland City mayoral election was part of the New Zealand local elections held that same year. In 2001, elections were held for the Mayor of Auckland plus other local government positions including nineteen city councillors. The polling was conducted using the standard first-past-the-post electoral method.

Mayoralty results
The following table gives the election results:

Ward results

Candidates were also elected from wards to the Auckland City Council.

References

External links

Mayoral elections in Auckland
2001 elections in New Zealand
Politics of the Auckland Region
2000s in Auckland
October 2001 events in New Zealand